Lindsay or Lindsey is an English surname and given name. The given name comes from the Scottish surname and clan name, which comes from the toponym Lindsey, which in turn comes from the Old English toponym Lindesege ("Island of Lind") for the city of Lincoln, in which Lind is the original Brittonic form of the name of Lincoln and island refers to Lincoln being an island in the surrounding fenland. Lindum Colonia was the Roman name of the settlement which is now the City of Lincoln in Lincolnshire. (Lindum Colonia was shortened in Old English to Lindocolina and then Lincylene.) Lindum was a Latinized form of a native Brittonic name which has been reconstructed as *Lindon, which means "pool" or "lake" (cf. the second part of the name Dublin and modern Welsh ) and refers to the Brayford Pool.

In the late 19th century, the surnames Lindsay and Lindsey began to be used as given names, at first only as masculine names. They remained typically masculine until the 1960s in Britain and the 1970s in the United States. They are both now feminine names in the United States. In Australia, New Zealand, and Scotland, Lindsay remains popular for masculine use and Lindsey has mainly become feminine. As a first name, Lindsey was the 570th most popular name for girls born in the United States in 2014, while Lindsay ranked 653rd. Both spellings ranked among the top 100 names for girls from 1980 through 1993, with Lindsey peaking at #35 in 1983 and 1984 and Lindsay peaking at #36 in the same years.

Common alternative spellings of this name include but are not limited to: Lindie, Lindy, Linni, Linnie, Linny, Linds, Linza, Elle, Ell, Ellie, Ella.

Surname
The surname comes from the name of the Anglo-Saxon kingdom of Lindsey. The first user was Sir Walter de Lindesay, one of the retainers of David I of Scotland.

The surname of Lindsay continued to be borne by the Earls of Balcarres and Earls of Crawford, down to the current holder of the title, Robert Lindsay, 29th Earl of Crawford (born 1927), while the Earls of Lindsay have used the additional surname of Lindesay since its adoption by Reginald Lindesay-Bethune, 12th Earl of Lindsay in 1919.

The names of John de Lindsay (died 1335), Ingram Lindsay (15th century) David Lyndsay (c. 1490 – c. 1555) and Robert Lindsay of Pitscottie (1532–1580) are early examples of the name being used as "surname" by members of lower nobility in Scotland. Lindsay was used in the United Kingdom by younger sons of the Lindsay clan chiefs, acquiring the status of common surname in the course of the 19th century.

The surname Lindsay is also found in Northern Ireland. Irish people called Lindsay are either descended from members of the Scottish clan Lindsay who migrated to Ireland, or alternatively of the Gaelic O'Loinsigh sept, who sometimes anglicized their name as Lindsay, even though more common anglicizations were Lynch or Linchey. In addition, the MacClintock (MacIlliuntaig) family anglicized their name as Lindsay in the 17th century.

Five men called Linsey are recorded as heads of families in the 1790 United States Census of Prince George's County.

Alec Lindsay (born 1948), English international footballer (Liverpool FC)
Alexander Lindsay Jr. (1871–1926), Justice of the Territorial Supreme Court of Hawaii 
Alvin Francis Lindsay (1882–1957), American politician, Missouri state representative
Anna Lindsay (1845–1903), Scottish women's activist
Anna Robertson Brown Lindsay (1864–1948), American theologian
Archie Lindsay (born 1882), Scottish footballer
Arthur Fydell Lindsay (1816–1895), South Australian surveyor and politician
Arto Lindsay (born 1953), American musician
Chike Lindsay (born 1983), American kickboxer
Cressida Lindsay (1930-2010), English novelist
Daryl Lindsay (1889–1976), Australian, brother of Norman Lindsay
David Lindsay (explorer) (1856–1922) leader of 1891 Elder expedition to Central Australia
David Lyndsay (poet)  (c. 1490 – c. 1555), also spelled Lindsay, renaissance poet in the court of James V of Scotland
Duncan Morton Lindsay (1902–1972), Scottish football player 
Germaine Lindsay (1985–2005), Jamaican-born British Islamist terrorist involved in the 7 July 2005 London bombings
Gillian Lindsay (born 1973), Scottish rower
Harry Lindsay (1881–1963), British civil servant and administrator
Hilarie Lindsay (1922–2021), Australian toy manufacturer and writer
Iain Lindsay (born 1959), British diplomat
Jack Lindsay (1900-1990), Australian writer, son of Norman Lindsay
James Alexander Lindsay (1815–1874), British Conservative Member of Parliament for Wigan, second son of James Lindsay, 24th Earl of Crawford
James Alexander Lindsay (physician) (1856–1931), British physician and professor of medicine
James Lindsay (Conservative politician) (1906–1997)
Jeff Lindsay (writer) (born 1952), American fiction writer
John Lindsay (1921–2000), American politician
Joseph Lindsay (1858–1933), Scottish international footballer
Justine Lindsay (born 1992), American dancer and NFL Cheerleader
Lionel Lindsay (1874–1961), Australian artist, brother of Norman Lindsay
Mark Lindsay (born 1942), American pop singer
Maurice Lindsay (rugby league), rugby league administrator (Wigan)
Maurice Lindsay (broadcaster) (1918–2009), Scottish broadcaster, writer and poet
Morgan Lindsay (1857–1935), a British Army officer and racehorse trainer
Norman Lindsay (1879–1969), Australian artist, of famous Lindsay family
Patrick Lindsay (disambiguation)
Percy Lindsay (1870–1952), Australian artist, brother of Norman Lindsay
Philip Lindsay (1906-1958), Australian writer, son of Norman Lindsay
Phillip Lindsay (born 1994), American football player
Reg Lindsay (1929–2008), Australian country and western singer
Robert Lindsay (disambiguation)
Ronald Lindsay (1877–1945), UK Ambassador to the United States, fifth son of James Lindsay, 26th Earl of Crawford
Ruby Lindsay (1885–1919), Australian artist, sister of Norman Lindsay
Ryan Lindsay (born 1976), Canadian former professional ice hockey player
Ryan Lindsay (born 1993), Canadian country music singer
Sandie Lindsay, 1st Baron Lindsay of Birker (1879–1952), Master of Balliol College, Oxford, son of Thomas Martin Lindsay
Sir Martin Lindsay, 1st Baronet, British politician and explorer (1905–1981)
Ted Lindsay (1925–2019), Canadian–American ice hockey player
Thomas Martin Lindsay (1843–1914)
Vachel Lindsay (1879–1931), American poet
William Lauder Lindsay (1829–1880), Scottish physician and botanist
Yvonne Lindsay, romance novelist from New Zealand

Given name

Male
Lindsay Anderson (1923–1994), British film director
Lindsay Barrett (born 1941), Jamaican-born writer
Lindsay Brown (baseball) (1911–1987), American baseball player
Lindsay Crosby (1938–1989); American actor and singer 
Lindsay Dawson (born 1959), American artist
Lindsay Gaze (born 1936), Australian basketball player and coach
Lindsay Hamilton (born 1962), Scottish footballer
Lindsay Hassett (1913–1993), Australian Test cricketer
Lindsay Hoyle (born 1957), Speaker of the House of Commons, Member of Parliament for Chorley (England)
Lindsay Kemp (1938–2018), British dancer, actor, teacher, mime artist and choreographer
Lindsay Kline (born 1934), Australian Test cricketer
Lindsay Knapp (born 1970), Football player
Lindsay G. Merrithew (born 1964), Canadian entrepreneur, executive producer, producer, and actor
Lindsay Rogers (1891–1970), Burgess Professor of Public Law, Columbia University (1920–1959); Director, Social Science Research Council (1934–36)
Lindsay Scott (born 1960), American football player
Lindsay Sloper (1826–1887), English pianist
Lindsay Tait (born 1982), New Zealand basketball player
Lindsay Tuckett (born 1919), South African cricketer
Lindsay Weir (1908–2003), New Zealand cricketer

Female
Lindsay Armstrong (born before 1970), South-African born Australian writer 
Lindsay Bartholomew (born 1944), English artist 
Lindsay Cooper (1951–2013), English musician and political activist 
Lindsay Czarniak (born 1977), American sports anchor and reporter 
Lindsay Davenport (born 1976), American tennis player
Lindsay Ell (born 1989), Canadian country singer-songwriter and guitarist 
Lindsay Ellingson (born 1984), American fashion model, Victoria's Secret Angel
Lindsay Ellis (born 1984), American film critic and author
Lindsay Felton (born 1984), American actress 
Lindsay Gottlieb (born 1977), American basketball coach 
Lindsay Hartley (born 1978), American actress 
Lindsay Hawker (1984–2007), British murder victim 
Lindsay Lee-Waters (born 1977), American tennis player 
Lindsay Lohan (born 1986), American actress and singer 
Lindsay Morton, American cancer epidemiologist 
Lindsay Pagano (born 1986), American singer 
Lindsay Price (born 1976), American actress and singer 
Lindsay Seidel, American voice actress
Lindsay Sloane (born 1977), American actress 
Lindsay Tarpley (born 1983), American soccer player 
Lindsay Taylor (born 1981), American basketball player 
Lindsay Wagner (born 1949), American actress 
Lindsay Whalen (born 1982), American basketball player

Notable fictional characters
Lindsay Bluth Fünke, a character on Arrested Development
Lindsay Boxer, a character on Women's Murder Club
Lindsay Dole, an attorney on The Practice
Lindsay Monroe, a character on CSI: NY
Lindsay Rappaport, a character on One Life to Live
Lindsay Weir, a character on Freaks and Geeks
Lindsay, a character on the Canadian animated series Total Drama

People named Lindsey

Surname
Adrian Lindsey (1895–1980), American athlete and coach
Ben Lindsey (basketball) (born c. 1939), American collegiate basketball coach
Ben Lindsey (jurist) (1869–1943), American judge and social reformer
Brandon Lindsey, American football player
Charles H. Lindsey, British computer scientist
Chris Lindsey, American country music songwriter and producer
Isaac Coleman Lindsey (1892–1968), Louisiana politician
David L. Lindsey, novelist
Geoff Lindsey, writer
George Lindsey, American actor
Hal Lindsey, American evangelist and Christian writer
Hillary Lindsey, country music songwriter
Jim Lindsey, University of Arkansas trustee
Johanna Lindsey (1952–2019), American romance novelist
June Lindsey (born 1922), British-Canadian physicist and crystallographer
Kate Lindsey, American operatic mezzo-soprano
Korey Lindsey, American football player
Lawrence B. Lindsey, economist
Martin Lindsey, English vice-chancellor
Melvin Lindsey, broadcaster
Stephen Lindsey, U.S. politician
Steve Lindsey, U.S. record producer
Steven W. Lindsey, U.S. astronaut
Theophilus Lindsey, theologian, founder of Unitarianism in England

Given name

Male
Lindsey Buckingham (born 1949), American guitarist, singer, composer, and producer, member of Fleetwood Mac
Lindsey Durlacher (1974–2011), US Greco-Roman wrestler
Lindsey Graham (born 1955), American politician and US Senator from South Carolina since 2003
Spessard Lindsey Holland (1892–1971), American politician
Lindsey Hugh Holliman, politician
Lindsey Hughes, historian
Lindsey Hunter (born 1970), American basketball player
Lindsey Lamar, American football player
Lindsey Nelson (1919–1995), American sportscaster
Jay Lindsey Tibbs, baseball player
Lindsey Witten (born 1988), American football player

Female
Lindsey Berg (born 1980), American volleyball player
Lindsey Cardinale (born 1985), American singer and American Idol contestant
Lindsey Davis (born 1949), English novelist
Lindsey Decker (1923–1994), American artist
Lindsey Earner-Byrne, Professor of Irish Gender History
Lindsey Evans (born 1989), American fashion model and beauty queen
Lindsey German (born 1951), British politician
Lindsey Haun (born 1984), American actress and singer
Lindsey Hilsum (born 1958), English news reporter
Lindsey Jacobellis (born 1985), American snowboarder
Lindsey McKeon (born 1982), American actress
Lindsey Pelas (born 1991), American model
Lindsey Russell (born 1991), British television presenter
Lindsey Shaw (born 1989), American actress
Lindsey Stirling (born 1986), American violinist
Lindsey Van (born 1984), American ski jumper
Lindsey Vonn (born 1984), American alpine skier
Lindsey Vuolo (born 1981), photographer's model
Lindsey Wixson (born 1994), American fashion model
Lindsey Wright (born 1979), American professional golfer

Notable fictional characters 
 Lindsey Butterfield, a character on the soap opera Hollyoaks
 Lindsey McDonald, a character on the TV show Angel
 Lindsey Naegle, a minor character on the TV show The Simpsons
 Lindsey Novak, a character on the sci-fi series Stargate SG-1

Other variations

Lyndsay

 Lyndsay DePaul (born 1988), American swimmer
 Lyndsay Glohe (born 1988), Australian football player
 Lyndsay Hammond, Australian musician
 Lyndsay Kahler (born 1974), American beauty pageant
 Lyndsay McIntosh (born 1955), Scottish politician
 Lyndsay Meyer (born 1973), American ski-mountaineer
 Lyndsay Proctor, New Zealand rugby player
 Lyndsay Wall (born 1985), American ice-hockey player

Linsay
Linsay Felton (born 1984), American actor
Linsay Willier, Canadian model

Linsey
Surname
Joseph Linsey (1899–1994), organized crime figure in Boston's underworld during Prohibition
Julie Linsey (born 1979), American mechanical engineer
Meghan Linsey (born 1985), American musician, singer-songwriter, and runner-up of NBC's The Voice season 8
Given names
Linsey Corbin (born 1981), American triathlete
Linsey Godfrey (born 1989), American actor
Linsey MacDonald (born 1964), former Scottish sprinter from Dunfermline, Fife
Linsey Dawn McKenzie (born 1978), English glamour model, pornographic actress, and minor celebrity

Lyndsie
Lyndsie Fogarty (born 1984), Australian sprint canoeist 
Lyndsie Holland (1939–2014), English singer and actress

Lyndsey
 Lyndsey Marshal (born 1978), English actor
 Lyndsey Patterson (born 1982), American soccer player
 Lyndsey Pfaff (born 1978), Belgian television personality
 Lyndsey Rodrigues (born 1981), Australian television personality
 Martin Lyndsey, English 16th-century academic administrator

Lyndsy
Lyndsy Fonseca (born 1987), American actress

Lynsay
 Lynsay Ryan (born 1984), Canadian curler
 Lynsay Sands, Canadian author

Lynsey
Lynsey Addario (born 1973), American photojournalist
Lynsey Askew (born 1986), English cricketer
Lynsey Bartilson (born 1983), American actor
Lynsey Baxter (born 1959), English actor
Lynsey de Paul (born 1948), English singer-songwriter
Lynsey DuFour, American television soap opera writer
Lynsey Dyer (born 1983), American freestyle skier 
Lynsey Hipgrave (born 1979), English television and radio presenter formerly known as Lynsey Horn
Lynsey McCullough (born 1991), Irish tennis player
Lynsey Sharp (born 1990), Scottish athlete
 Fictional characters
Lynsey Nolan, character on the British soap opera Hollyoaks

Linni
Linni Meister (born 1985), Norwegian model

See also
Lindsay family tree, showing the relationship between some of the above

Notes

English-language unisex given names
English unisex given names
English masculine given names
English feminine given names
Scottish unisex given names
Scottish masculine given names
Scottish feminine given names
English-language surnames
English toponymic surnames
Surnames of Lowland Scottish origin